The Bamenda apalis (Apalis bamendae) is a species of bird in the family Cisticolidae.
It is endemic to Cameroon.

Its natural habitats are subtropical or tropical moist lowland forest and dry savanna.
It is threatened by habitat loss.

References

Bamenda apalis
Birds of Central Africa
Endemic birds of Cameroon
Bamenda apalis
Bamenda apalis
Taxonomy articles created by Polbot
Fauna of the Cameroonian Highlands forests